Shin Shwe was a principal queen consort of King Narathihapate of the Pagan Dynasty of Burma (Myanmar). She was the mother of Queen Mi Saw U of Pagan and later Pinya, and the maternal grandmother of kings Uzana I of Pinya and Kyawswa I of Pinya.

References

Bibliography
 

Queens consort of Pagan